Grenoble-Alpes Métropole is the métropole, an intercommunal structure, centred on the city of Grenoble. It is located in the Isère department, in the Auvergne-Rhône-Alpes region, eastern France. It was created in January 2015, replacing the previous Communauté d'agglomération de Grenoble. Its area is 545.5 km2. Its population was 445,059 in 2018, of which 157,650 in Grenoble proper.

Communes 
The 49 communes of the metropolis are:

Bresson
Brié-et-Angonnes
Champagnier
Champ-sur-Drac
Claix
Corenc
Domène
Échirolles
Eybens
Fontaine
Fontanil-Cornillon
Gières
Grenoble
Herbeys
Jarrie
La Tronche
Le Gua
Le Pont-de-Claix
Le Sappey-en-Chartreuse
Meylan
Miribel-Lanchâtre
Montchaboud
Mont-Saint-Martin
Murianette
Notre-Dame-de-Commiers
Notre-Dame-de-Mésage
Noyarey
Poisat
Proveysieux
Quaix-en-Chartreuse
Saint-Barthélemy-de-Séchilienne
Saint-Égrève
Saint-Georges-de-Commiers
Saint-Martin-d'Hères
Saint-Martin-le-Vinoux
Saint-Paul-de-Varces
Saint-Pierre-de-Mésage
Sarcenas
Sassenage
Séchilienne
Seyssinet-Pariset
Seyssins
Varces-Allières-et-Risset
Vaulnaveys-le-Bas
Vaulnaveys-le-Haut
Venon
Veurey-Voroize
Vif
Vizille

See also
Urban unit of Grenoble
Grenoble metropolitan area

References

External links
official website of Metro (French)

Cities in Auvergne-Rhône-Alpes
Metropolis in France
Intercommunalities of Isère
Geography of Grenoble